Ratchaburi Provincial Stadium is a stadium in Ratchaburi Province, Thailand. The stadium holds 10,000 people.  It is currently used mostly for football matches and is the formerly home stadium of Ratchaburi Mitr Phol.

References

Football venues in Thailand
Sport in Ratchaburi province
Buildings and structures in Ratchaburi province

ja:サムットソンクラーム・スタジアム